The Mughal Emperors who ruled South Asia from 1526 to 1857 used titles in Arabic, Persian and Chagatai language. Sons of the emperors used the title Shahzada and Mirza.

Alam Panah/Jahan Panah
Prince Shah Khurram, later called the Mughal Emperor Shah Jahan, (full title: Shahenshah Al-Sultan al-'Azam wal Khaqan al-Mukarram, Malik-ul-Sultanat, Ala Hazrat Abu'l-Muzaffar Shahab ud-din Muhammad Shah Jahan I, Sahib-e-Qiran-e-Sani, Badshah-e-Ghazi Zillu'llah, Firdaus-Ashiyani, Shahenshah-E-Sultanat Ul-Hindiyyah Wal Mughaliyyah.)

[Persianized-Arabic transliterated pronunciation:
Shāhenshāh as-Sulṭān al-’A‘aẓam wa-’l-Khāqān al-Mukarram, Māliku ’s-Sulṭānāt, ‘ala’ Ḥaḍrāt ’Abū ’l-Muẓaffar Shahābu-’ddin Muḥammad Shāh Jahān, Ṣāhib-i Qirān-i Thānī, Bādshāh Ghāzī Ẓillu’llah, Firdaws Āshiyānē, Shāhenshāhe-Sulṭānātu ’l-Hindiyyah wa-’l-Mughaliyyah]

Persianized-Arabic:
شَاهَنْشَاه ٱلْسُّلْطَانُ ٱلْأَعْظَم وَٱلْخَاقَنُ ٱلْمُكَرَّمُ مَالِكُ ٱلْسُّلْطَنَات عَلَى حَضْرَات أَبو ٱلْمُظَفَّر شَهَابُ ٱلْدِّين مُحَمَّد شَاه جَهَان صَاحِبِ قِرَانِ ٱلْثَّانِي بادِشَاه غَازِى ظِلُّ ٱلله فِرْدَوس آشِيَانَه شَاهَنْشَاهِ سُلْطَنَاتُ ٱلْهِنْدِيَّه وَٱلْمُغَالِيَّه

A Persianized Arabic titles for the following:

1) Alam Panah/ Aalam Panaah or (translit.) ‘Aālam Panāh (عَالَم پَنَاه) meaning from the Arabic-Persian: "Realm/ World/ Cosmos/ Universe of Refuge/ Protection" (literary: "Protector of the Universe")

2) Jahan Panah/ Jahaan Panaah or (translit.) Jahān Panāh (جَهَان پَنَاه) meaning from the pure Persian: "Realm/ World/ Cosmos/ Universe of Refuge/ Protection" (literary: "Protector of the Universe")

This title means giver of peace (Persian: Panāh - پَنَاه) also "refuge/ protector", or the giver of refuge to the world (Persian, formerly Arabic: Alam/ pure Persian: Jahan).

Al-Sultan al-Azam 
Al-Sultan al-Azam (As-Sultwaanu-’l-’A‘azwam or (translit.) As-Sulṭānu ’l-’A‘aẓam (السُّلْطَانُ ٱلْأَعْظَمُ) is a Persianized Arabic imperial title meaning from the Arabic: "The Great or Most Mighty of Authority/ Sovereign/ Dominion". "Al - أَل" is an Arabic definite article meaning 'the', while Sultan (سُلْطَان) is a Persianized Arabic title (literally meaning Authority/ Sovereign/ Dominion) for autonomous rulers since the Abbasid era of Islamic history, while Azam (أَعْظَم), another Arabic word, means "Great or Most Mighty". The title was used by the early rulers of the Mughal Empire such as Babur, Humayun, Jahangir and Shah Jahan. The sixth emperor Aurangzeb is also reported to have held the title al-Sultan al-Azam.

Badshah-e-Ghazi
Badshah-e-Ghazi/Baadshaah-e Ghaazi or (translit.) Bādshāhe-Ghāzī', literary meaning of the Perso-Arabic imperial title: "Warrior Emperor". Badshah (بادِشَاه) is a Persian title meaning "Emperor/Monarch/Ruler" (literally meaning Lord or Master of Kings), often translated as Emperor, while Ghazi (غَازِى) meant in Arabic "conqueror" or an Islamic warrior.

Sahib-e-Qiran
This imperial title means "The Lord of the Auspicious Conjunction (صَاحِبِ قِرَان)" in Persianized Arabic and refers to a ruler whose horoscope features a particular conjunction of Jupiter and Saturn, portending a reign of world-conquest and justice.

Formerly adopted from the Arabic, meaning "Companion/ Associate of (the) Conjunction [literary: apparent proximity of two heavenly bodies]" - explained in the next paragraph, whereas the Arabic words: 'ṣāḥib' - صَاحِبِ' meaning "companion/ associate" and 'qirān - قِرَان' meaning "conjunction of two heavenly bodies" is the plural of 'qarn - قَرْن' (literary meaning: 'junction - a point at which two or more things are joined'). 

The title has a long and varied history among Islamo-Persianate rulers, beginning with the Mongols and Mamluks and further developed under the Timurids. The Mughal emperors Shah Jahan and Akbar Shah II called themselves "Sahib-e Qiran-i Sani - (Arabic: Ṣāḥibi Qirāni Thānī/ Ath-Thānī - صَاحِبِ قِرَانِ ثَانِي\ ٱلْثَانِي)", which means "The Second Lord of Auspicious Conjunction", where "sani" is the adopted Arabic word for the cardinal "(the) second/ next" ["thānī" - ثَانِي]. The first Lord of Conjunction in this formulation is assumed to have been Alexander the Great, but it simultaneously references the progenitor of the Mughals, Timur, who was most famously described as the Sahib-e Qiran by Ibn Khaldun.  Timur did not use this title himself, but the court historians of his successors routinely applied this title to him and his successors.

Shahenshah
The royal title Shahenshah (شاهنشاه) is a Persian word meaning the "Emperor" or "King of Kings".

Al-Mukarram 
Al-Mukarram (ٱلْمُكَرَّمُ) meaning the Perso-Arabic title: "Honorable or Generous". Mukarram (مُکَرَّم) means 'possessor of the honorable or generous' or 'the honorable or the generous', in Urdu adopted from Arabic. The title al-Mukarram reportedly appeared on Aurangzeb's full imperial title. Sometimes, the word al-Khaqan became a prefix for al-Mukarram in the form al-Khaqan al-Mukarram/Al-Khaaqaan Al-Mukarram or (translit.) Al-Khāqānu ’l-Mukarram (أَلْخَاقَانُ ٱلْمُكَرَّمُ). Khaqan or Khagan (خَاقَان) adopted from the Mongol ancestral roots of "khan (خَان)" meaning "leader" or "prince" - "descended" was an imperial Perso-Turkic Mongol title, used by the Mughal Emperors to show descent from the Khans.

Zillullah (Ẓillu’llah)/ Zwillu'llah 
Ẓillu’llah or (translit.) Zwillu’llah (ظِلُّ ٱلله) is an Arabic word-phrase meaning the Shadow or Shade of God (Allah - الله), literally "the Refuge of Allah".

Shahenshah-e-Sultanat Al-Hindiyyah wa Al-Mughaliyyah 
Shahenshah-e-Sultanat Al-Hindiyyah wa Al-Mughaliyyah or (translit.) Shāhenshāhe-Sulṭānātu ’l-Hindiyyah wa-’l-Mughaliyyah (شَاهَنْشَاهِ سُلْطَنَاتُ ٱلْهِنْدِيَّه وَٱلْمُغَالِيَّه) is a Persianized Arabic imperial title meaning: "Emperor of the Sultanate of India and the Mughals.

Firdaus Ashiyani 
Firdaus Ashiyani/ Firdaws Aashiyaneh or Firdaws Āshiyānē (فِرْدَوس آشِيَانَه) is a Persianized Arabic imperial title meaning: "Domain of Paradise". "Firdaus - فِرْدَوس" for another word for "heaven" in Arabic, where the adopted English word form is "paradise" and the Persian "Ashiyaneh - آشِيَانَه" meaning "nest" or "domain". It was used for deceased emperors.

References

Imperial titles
Mughal emperors
Titles in India